Hog Day Afternoon may refer to:

Hog Day Afternoon (Gotham)
Hog Day Afternoon (Kappa Mikey)